"Higher Than Hope" is the third single released by Daryl Braithwaite from his third studio album, Rise. The single was released in May 1991 and peaked at number 28 on the Australian ARIA Singles Chart. The song also peaked at number 47 on the US Billboard Hot 100 and number 73 on the Canadian RPM Top Singles chart, his only single to chart in these countries. Braithwaite promoted the single in US from 18 June to 31 July 1990 and the music video was filmed in Los Angeles. It is also one of the few songs in Braithwaite's repertoire to feature him playing an instrument in addition to singing.

At the APRA Music Awards of 1992 the song won Most Performed Australian Work.

Background
According to an interview conducted shortly after the release of the Rise album, Braithwaite titled the song after the Nelson Mandela biography of the same name, based on lyrical ideas from song co-writer and producer Simon Hussey. Hussey had first drawn inspiration for the tune from watching a newscast showing riots in South Africa. Braithwaite felt that the title "Higher Than Hope" was consistent with the message that both he and Hussey were endeavoring to convey with the song, namely the notion of, as Braithwaite describes, going beyond "just wishing about" the resolution of conflict, "like a...I guess, very idealistic [song], in a sense."

Track listing
CD single
 "Higher Than Hope" (single edit) – 4:29
 "You Will Find a Way" – 4:20

Personnel
Daryl Braithwaite – lead vocals, Hammond Leslie organ
Simon Hussey – keyboards, Hammond organ, synth bass, drum machine, brass arrangements
Jef Scott – electric guitar, acoustic guitar
Andy Cichon – bass guitar
John Watson – drums
"The Brasstards":
Mark Dennison – saxophone
Kevin Dubber – trumpet
John Farnham – backing vocals

Charts

References

1990 songs
1991 singles
Songs written by Simon Hussey
CBS Records singles
Song recordings produced by Simon Hussey
Daryl Braithwaite songs
Songs written by Daryl Braithwaite
APRA Award winners